Armadillosuchus is an extinct genus of sphagesaurid crocodylomorph. It was described in February 2009 from the late Campanian to early Maastrichtian Adamantina Formation of the Bauru Basin in Brazil, dating to approximately 70 Ma.

Sphagesaurids share a number of mammal-like features in their teeth and jaws, although they are unrelated to mammals. Armadillosuchus is especially mammal-like in that it had heavy body armor characterized by flexible bands and rigid shields that covered its back, less like the traditional osteoderms that line the backs of most crurotarsans and more like that of a modern armadillo (hence the genus name meaning "armadillo crocodile") or a glyptodont. Because of its unique morphology, it is believed to have had a terrestrial and quite possibly fossorial lifestyle.

Features

Armour plating 
Directly behind the skull of Armadillosuchus, protecting the neck, the osteoderms normal to a crocodyliform are fused together to create a rigid shield of hexagonal plates, known by Marinho and Carvalho the researchers as a 'cervical shield'. This is then loosely linked to seven bands of armour that could be moved a little, allowing Armadillosuchus to flex its spine. However, it would probably have been more like a modern giant armadillo or nine-banded armadillo, which can tuck their legs underneath for protection but cannot roll up, than the three-banded armadillo, which can roll entirely into a ball for protection. Each of the armour bands corresponded to several rows of osteoderms that had been fused together.

The armour plating on Armadillosuchus`s tail was more normal for a crocodyliform, but the tall osteoderms along the dorsal surface that provide extra power when swimming for aquatic or riverine species were absent. This feature, along with the long and fairly upright legs, provides evidence that Armadillosuchus had undergone a process of adaptive radiation to fill the ecological niches on land and was entirely terrestrial.

Other noteworthy features 
The fossil specimen of Armadillosuchus is not complete, but thanks to the protective armour plating much of it has been reasonably well preserved. The skull is small, with a relatively short snout. The teeth are very unusual; rather than the normal homodont dentition of most crocodyliforms, it had large (approx 6-7 cm) curved teeth like canines, protruding front teeth that resembled incisors, and conical teeth with shearing edges filling the remainder of its mouth. This is common among all sphagesaurids, which often have mammaliform teeth and jaws despite being only distantly related. It is hypothesised therefore that Armadillosuchus was omnivorous.

Armadillosuchus also had long claws on the front legs, which might have been used for digging - whether creating burrows for its own protection or unearthing buried food sources such as roots or small mammals is unknown, though its relatively large size might count against the former. Like an armadillo, it could probably have used these effectively to defend itself, although unlike an armadillo it would also have had a vicious and dangerous bite due to its long 'canine' teeth.

References

External links 
 "Armadillosuchus: One bad crocodyliform" at National Geographic with images

Sphagesaurids
Terrestrial crocodylomorphs
Late Cretaceous crocodylomorphs of South America
Campanian life
Maastrichtian life
Cretaceous Brazil
Fossils of Brazil
Adamantina Formation
Fossil taxa described in 2009
Prehistoric pseudosuchian genera